A rhinoceros, commonly abbreviated to rhino, is a member of any of the five extant species (or numerous extinct species) of odd-toed ungulates in the family Rhinocerotidae. (It can also refer to a member of any of the extinct species of the superfamily Rhinocerotoidea.) Two of the extant species are native to Africa, and three to South and Southeast Asia.

Rhinoceroses are some of the largest remaining megafauna: all weigh at least one tonne in adulthood. They have a herbivorous diet, small brains  for mammals of their size, one or two horns, and a thick , protective skin formed from layers of collagen positioned in a lattice structure. They generally eat leafy material, although their ability to ferment food in their hindgut allows them to subsist on more fibrous plant matter when necessary. Unlike other perissodactyls, the two African species of rhinoceros lack teeth at the front of their mouths; they rely instead on their lips to pluck food.

Rhinoceros are killed by poachers for their horns, which are bought and sold on the black market for high prices, leading to most living rhinoceros species being considered endangered. The contemporary market for rhino horn is overwhelmingly driven by China and Vietnam, where it is bought by wealthy consumers to use in traditional Chinese medicine, among other uses. Rhino horns are made of keratin, the same material as hair and fingernails, and there is no good evidence of any health benefits. A market also exists for rhino horn dagger handles in Yemen, which was the major source of demand for rhino horn in the 1970s and 1980s.

Taxonomy and naming 

The plural in English is rhinoceros or rhinoceroses. The collective noun for a group of rhinoceroses is crash or herd. The name has been in use since the 14th century.

The family Rhinocerotidae consists of only four extant genera: Ceratotherium (white rhinoceros), Diceros (black rhinoceros), Dicerorhinus (Sumatran rhinoceros), and Rhinoceros (Indian and Javan rhinoceros). The living species fall into three categories. The two African species, the white rhinoceros and the black rhinoceros, belong to the tribe Dicerotini, which originated in the middle Miocene, about 14.2 million years ago. The species diverged during the early Pliocene (about 5 million years ago). The main difference between black and white rhinos is the shape of their mouths – white rhinos have broad flat lips for grazing, whereas black rhinos have long pointed lips for eating foliage. There are two living Rhinocerotini species, the Indian rhinoceros and the Javan rhinoceros, which diverged from one another about 10 million years ago. The Sumatran rhinoceros is the only surviving representative of the Dicerorhinini.

A subspecific hybrid white rhino (Ceratotherium s. simum × C. s. cottoni) was bred at the Dvůr Králové Zoo (Zoological Garden Dvur Kralove nad Labem) in the Czech Republic in 1977. Interspecific hybridisation of black and white rhinoceros has also been confirmed.

While the black rhinoceros has 84 chromosomes (diploid number, 2N, per cell), all other rhinoceros species have 82 chromosomes. Chromosomal polymorphism might lead to varying chromosome counts. For instance, in a study there were three northern white rhinoceroses with 81 chromosomes.

Species

White 

There are two subspecies of white rhinoceros: the southern white rhinoceros (Ceratotherium simum simum) and the northern white rhinoceros (Ceratotherium simum cottoni). As of 2013, the southern subspecies has a wild population of 20,405—making them the most abundant rhino subspecies in the world. The northern subspecies is critically endangered, with all that is known to remain being two captive females. There is no conclusive explanation of the name "white rhinoceros". A popular idea that "white" is a distortion of either the Afrikaans word wyd or the Dutch word wijd (or its other possible spellings whyde, weit, etc.,), meaning "wide" and referring to the rhino's square lips, is not supported by linguistic studies.

The white rhino has an immense body and large head, a short neck and broad chest. Females weigh  and males . On its snout it has two horns. The front horn is larger than the other horn and averages  in length and can reach . The white rhinoceros also has a prominent muscular hump that supports its relatively large head. The colour of this animal can range from yellowish brown to slate grey. Most of its body hair is found on the ear fringes and tail bristles, with the rest distributed rather sparsely over the rest of the body. White rhinos have the distinctive flat broad mouth that is used for grazing.

Black 

The name "black rhinoceros" (Diceros bicornis) was chosen to distinguish this species from the white rhinoceros (Ceratotherium simum). This can be confusing, as the two species are not truly distinguishable by color. There are four subspecies of black rhino: South-central (Diceros bicornis minor), the most numerous, which once ranged from central Tanzania south through Zambia, Zimbabwe and Mozambique to northern and eastern South Africa; South-western (Diceros bicornis occidentalis) which are better adapted to the arid and semi-arid savannas of Namibia, southern Angola, western Botswana and western South Africa; East African (Diceros bicornis michaeli), primarily in Tanzania; and West African (Diceros bicornis longipes) which was declared extinct in November 2011. The native Tswanan name keitloa describes a South African variation of the black rhino in which the posterior horn is equal to or longer than the anterior horn.

Two horns on the skull are made of keratin with the larger front horn typically 50 cm long, exceptionally up to 140 cm. Sometimes, a third smaller horn may develop. The black rhino is much smaller than the white rhino, and has a pointed mouth, which it uses to grasp leaves and twigs when feeding.

During the latter half of the 20th century, their numbers were severely reduced from an estimated 70,000 in the late 1960s to a record low of 2,410 in 1995. Since then, numbers have been steadily increasing at a continental level with numbers doubling to 4,880 by the end of 2010. As of 2008, the numbers are still 90% lower than three generations ago.

Indian 

The Indian rhinoceros, or greater one-horned rhinoceros, (Rhinoceros unicornis) has a single horn 20 to 60 cm long. It is nearly as large as the African white rhino. Its thick, silver-brown skin folds into the shoulder, back, and rump, giving it an armored appearance. Its upper legs and shoulders are covered in wart-like bumps, and it has very little body hair.

Indian rhinos once inhabited many areas ranging from Pakistan to Myanmar and maybe even parts of China. Because of humans, they now exist in only several protected areas of India (in Assam, West Bengal, and a few pairs in Uttar Pradesh) and Nepal, plus a pair in Lal Suhanra National Park in Pakistan reintroduced there from Nepal. They are confined to the tall grasslands and forests in the foothills of the Himalayas. Two-thirds of the world's Indian rhinoceroses are now confined to the Kaziranga National Park situated in the Golaghat district of Assam, India.

Javan 

The Javan rhinoceros (Rhinoceros sondaicus) is one of the most endangered large mammals in the world. According to 2015 estimates, only about 60 remain, in Java, Indonesia, all in the wild. It is also the least known rhino species. Like the closely related, and larger, Indian rhinoceros, the Javan rhino has a single horn. Its hairless, hazy gray skin falls into folds into the shoulder, back, and rump, giving it an armored appearance. Its length reaches  including the head, and its height . Adults are variously reported to weigh 900–1,400 kg or 1,360–2,000 kg. Male horns can reach 26 cm in length, while in females they are knobs or altogether absent. These animals prefer dense lowland rain forest, tall grass and reed beds that are plentiful with large floodplains and mud wallows.

Though once widespread throughout Asia, by the 1930s they were nearly hunted to extinction in Nepal, India, Burma, Peninsular Malaysia, and Sumatra for the supposed medical powers of their horns and blood. As of 2015, only 58–61 individuals remain in Ujung Kulon National Park, Java, Indonesia. The last known Javan rhino in Vietnam was reportedly killed for its horn in 2011 by Vietnamese poachers. Now only Java contains the last Javan rhinos.

Sumatran 

The Sumatran rhinoceros (Dicerorhinus sumatrensis) is the smallest extant rhinoceros species, as well as the one with the most hair. It can be found at very high altitudes in Borneo and Sumatra. Due to habitat loss and poaching, their numbers have declined and it has become the second most threatened rhinoceros. About 275 Sumatran rhinos are believed to remain. There are three subspecies of Sumatran rhinoceros: the Sumatran rhinoceros proper (Dicerorhinus sumatrensis sumatrensis), the Bornean rhinoceros (Dicerorhinus sumatrensis harrissoni) and the possibly extinct Northern Sumatran rhinoceros (Dicerorhinus sumatrensis lasiotis).

Males have much larger horns than the females. Hair can range from dense (the densest hair in young calves) to sparse. The color of these rhinos is reddish brown. The body is short and has stubby legs. The lip is prehensile.

Sumatran rhinoceros are on the verge of extinction due to loss of habitat and illegal hunting. Once they were spread across South-east Asia, but now they are confined to several parts of Indonesia and Malaysia due to reproductive isolation. There were 320 D. sumatrensis in 1995, which by 2011 have dwindled to 216. It has been found through DNA comparison that the Sumatran rhinoceros is the most ancient extant rhinoceros and related to the extinct Eurasian woolly rhino species, Coelodonta. In 1994 Alan Rabinowitz publicly denounced governments, non-governmental organizations, and other institutions for lacking in their attempts to conserve the Sumatran rhinoceros. To conserve it, they would have to relocate them from small forests to breeding programs that could monitor their breeding success. To boost reproduction, the Malaysian and Indonesian governments could also agree to exchange the gametes of the Sumatran and (smaller) Bornean subspecies. The Indonesian and Malaysian governments have also proposed a single management unit for these two ancient subspecies.

Plantations for palm oil have taken out the living areas and led to the eradication of the rhino in Sumatra.

Evolution 

Rhinocerotoids diverged from other perissodactyls by the early Eocene. Fossils of Hyrachyus eximus found in North America date to this period. This small hornless ancestor resembled a tapir or small horse more than a rhino. Four families, sometimes grouped together as the superfamily Rhinocerotoidea, evolved in the late Eocene, namely the Hyracodontidae, Amynodontidae, Paraceratheriidae and Rhinocerotidae.

Hyracodontidae 

Hyracodontidae, also known as "running rhinos", showed adaptations for speed, and would have looked more like horses than modern rhinos. The smallest hyracodontids were dog-sized. Hyracodontids spread across Eurasia from the mid-Eocene to early Oligocene.

Amynodontidae 

The Amynodontidae, also known as "aquatic rhinos", dispersed across North America and Eurasia, from the late Eocene to early Oligocene. The amynodontids were hippopotamus-like in their ecology and appearance, inhabiting rivers and lakes, and sharing many of the same adaptations to aquatic life as hippos.

Paraceratheriidae 

The Paraceratheriidae, also known as paraceratheres or indricotheres, originated in the Eocene epoch and lived until the early Miocene. The first paraceratheres were only about the size of large dogs, growing progressively larger in the late Eocene and Oligocene. The largest genus of the family was Paraceratherium, which was more than twice as heavy as a bull African elephant, and was one of the largest land mammals that ever lived.

Rhinocerotidae 
The family of all modern rhinoceros, the Rhinocerotidae, first appeared in the Late Eocene in Eurasia. The earliest members of Rhinocerotidae were small and numerous; at least 26 genera lived in Eurasia and North America until a wave of extinctions in the middle Oligocene wiped out most of the smaller species. Several independent lineages survived. Menoceras, a pig-sized rhinoceros, had two horns side by side. The North American Teleoceras had short legs, a barrel chest and lived until about five million years ago. The last rhinos in the Americas became extinct during the Pliocene.

Modern rhinos are thought to have begun dispersal from Asia during the Miocene. Alongside the extant species, four additional species of rhinoceros survived into the Last Glacial Period: the woolly rhinoceros (Coelodonta antiquitatis), Elasmotherium sibiricum and two species of Stephanorhinus, Merck's rhinoceros  (Stephanorhinus kirchbergensis) and the Narrow-nosed rhinoceros (Stephanorhinus hemitoechus). The woolly rhinoceros appeared in China around 1 million years ago and first arrived in Europe around 600,000 years ago. It reappeared 200,000 years ago, alongside the woolly mammoth, and became numerous. Elasmotherium was two meters tall, five meters long and weighed around five tons, with a single enormous horn, hypsodont teeth and long legs for running. The latest known well dated bones of Elasmotheriumin found in the south of Western Siberia (the area that is today Kazakhstan) date as recently as 39,000 years ago.

The origin of the two living African rhinos can be traced to the late Miocene species Ceratotherium neumayri. The lineages containing the living species diverged by the early Pliocene, when Diceros praecox, the likely ancestor of the black rhinoceros, appears in the fossil record. The black and white rhinoceros remain so closely related that they can still mate and successfully produce offspring.
Cladogram showing the relationships of recent and Late Pleistocene rhinoceros species (minus Stephanorhinus hemitoechus) based on whole nuclear genomes, after Liu et al., 2021:

 denotes extinct taxa
 Family Rhinocerotidae
 †Teletaceras
 †Uintaceras
 Subfamily Rhinocerotinae
 Tribe Aceratheriini
 †Aceratherium lived from 33.9 to 3.4 Ma
 †Acerorhinus 13.6–7.0 Ma
 †Alicornops 13.7–5.3 Ma
 †Aphelops 20.43–5.33 Ma
 †Chilotheridium 23.0–11.6 Ma
 †Chilotherium 13.7–3.4 Ma
 †Floridaceras 20.4–16.3 Ma
 †Hoploaceratherium 16.9–16.0 Ma
 †Mesaceratherium
 †Peraceras 20.6–10.3 Ma
 †Plesiaceratherium 20.0–11.6 Ma
 †Ronzotherium 37–23 Ma
 †Shansirhinus
 †Sinorhinus
 †Subchilotherium
 Tribe Teleoceratini
 †Aprotodon 28.4–5.330 Ma
 †Brachydiceratherium
 †Brachypotherium 20.0–5.33 Ma
 †Diaceratherium 28.4–16.0 Ma
 †Prosantorhinus 16.9–7.25 Ma
 †Shennongtherium
 †Teleoceras 16.9–4.9 Ma
 Rhinocerotina Burdigalian–Present
 Tribe Rhinocerotini 40.4–11.1 Ma–Present
 †Gaindatherium 11.6–11.1 Ma
 Subtribe Rhinocerotina 17.5 Ma–Present
 †Nesorhinus .70 Ma
 †Rusingaceros 17.5 Ma
 Rhinoceros – Indian & Javan rhinoceros
 Tribe Dicerorhinini
 †Pliorhinus 5-2.5 Ma
 †Coelodonta – Woolly rhinoceros
 Dicerorhinus – Sumatran rhinoceros
 †Dihoplus 11.610–1.810 Ma
 †Lartetotherium 15.97–8.7 Ma
 †Stephanorhinus 9.7–0.04 Ma – Merck's rhinoceros & Narrow-nosed rhinoceros
 Tribe Dicerotini 23.0–Present
 Ceratotherium – White rhinoceros 7.25–Present
 Diceros – Black rhinoceros 23.0–Present
 †Paradiceros 15.97–11.61 Ma
 Rhinocerotinae incertae sedis
 †Protaceratherium
 Subfamily Elasmotheriinae
 †Gulfoceras 23.03–20.43 Ma
 †Victoriaceros 15 Ma
 Tribe Diceratheriini
 †Diceratherium 33.9–11.6 Ma
 †Penetrigonias
 †Subhyracodon 38.0–26.3 Ma
 †Trigonias 37-34 Ma
 Tribe Elasmotheriini 20.0–0.1 Ma
 †Bugtirhinus 20.0–16.9 Ma
 †Caementodon
 †Elasmotherium – Giant rhinoceros 3.6–0.039 Ma
 †Hispanotherium synonymized with Huaqingtherium 16.0–7.25 Ma
 †Iranotherium
 †Kenyatherium
 †Meninatherium
 †Menoceras 23.03–16.3 Ma
 †Ningxiatherium
 †Ougandatherium 20.0–16.9 Ma
 †Parelasmotherium
 †Procoelodonta
 †Sinotherium 9.0–5.3 Ma

Predators, poaching and hunting 

Adult rhinoceros have no real predators in the wild, other than humans. Young rhinos sometimes fall prey to big cats, crocodiles, African wild dogs, and hyenas.

Although rhinos are large and aggressive and have a reputation for being resilient, they are very easily poached; they visit water holes daily and can be easily killed while they drink. As of December 2009, poaching increased globally while efforts to protect the rhino are considered increasingly ineffective. The most serious estimate, that only 3% of poachers are successfully countered, is reported of Zimbabwe, while Nepal has largely avoided the crisis. Poachers have become more sophisticated. South African officials have called for urgent action against poaching after poachers killed the last female rhino in the Krugersdorp Game Reserve near Johannesburg. Statistics from South African National Parks show that 333 rhinoceros were killed in South Africa in 2010, increasing to 668 by 2012, over 1,004 in 2013, and over 1,338 killed in 2015. In some cases rhinos are drugged and their horns removed, while in other instances more than the horn is taken.

The Namibian government has supported the practice of rhino trophy hunting as a way to raise money for conservation. Hunting licenses for five Namibian Black rhinos are auctioned annually, with the money going to the government's Game Products Trust Fund. Some conservationists and members of the public oppose or question this practice.

Horn use 

Rhinoceros horns develop from subcutaneous tissues, and are made of keratinous mineralized compartments. The horns root in a germinative layer.

Rhinoceros horns are used in traditional medicines in parts of Asia, and for dagger handles in Yemen and Oman. Esmond Bradley Martin has reported on the trade for dagger handles in Yemen. In Europe, it was historically believed that rhino horns could purify water and could detect poisoned liquids, and likely believed to be an aphrodisiac and an antidote to poison.

It is a common misconception that rhinoceros horn in powdered form is used as an aphrodisiac or a cure for cancer in traditional Chinese medicine (TCM) as Cornu Rhinoceri Asiatici (犀角, xījiǎo, "rhinoceros horn"); no TCM text in history has ever mentioned such prescriptions. In TCM, rhino horn is sometimes prescribed for fevers and convulsions, a treatment not supported by evidence-based medicine: this treatment has been compared to consuming fingernail clippings in water. In 1993, China signed the CITES treaty and removed rhinoceros horn from the Chinese medicine pharmacopeia, administered by the Ministry of Health. In 2011, the Register of Chinese Herbal Medicine in the United Kingdom issued a formal statement condemning the use of rhinoceros horn. A growing number of TCM educators are also speaking out against the practice, although some TCM practitioners still believe that it is a life-saving medicine.

Vietnam reportedly has the biggest number of rhino horn consumers, with their demand driving most of the poaching, which has risen to record levels. The "Vietnam CITES Management Authority" has claimed that Hanoi recently experienced a 77% drop in the usage of rhino horn, but National Geographic has challenged these claims, noticing that there was no rise in the numbers of criminals who were apprehended or prosecuted. South African rhino poaching's main destination market is Vietnam. An average sized horn can bring in as much as a quarter of a million dollars in Vietnam and many rhino range states have stockpiles of rhino horn.

Horn trade 
International trade in rhinoceros horn has been declared illegal by the Convention on International Trade in Endangered Species of Wild Fauna and Flora (CITES) since 1977. A proposal by Swaziland to lift the international ban was rejected in October 2016. Domestic sale of rhinoceros horn in South Africa, home of 80% of the remaining rhino population, was banned as of 2009. The ban was overturned in a court case in 2017, and South Africa plans to draft regulations for the sale of rhino horn, possibly including export for "non-commercial purposes". The South African government has proposed that a legal trade of rhino horn be established, arguing that this could reduce poaching and prevent the extinction of this species.

In March 2013, some researchers suggested that the only way to reduce poaching would be to establish a regulated trade based on humane and renewable harvesting from live rhinos. The World Wildlife Fund opposes legalization of the horn trade, as it may increase demand, while IFAW released a report by EcoLarge, suggesting that more thorough knowledge of economic factors is required to justify the pro-trade option.

Conservation 
According to the World Wide Fund for Nature, conservation of African rhinoceroses as consumers of large amounts of vegetation is crucial to maintaining the shape of the African landscape and the natural resources of local communities.

Ways to prevent poaching

Horn removal 
To prevent poaching, in certain areas, rhinos have been tranquillized and their horns removed. Armed park rangers, particularly in South Africa, are also working on the front lines to combat poaching, sometimes killing poachers who are caught in the act. A 2012 spike in rhino killings increased concerns about the future of the species.

Horn poisoning 
In 2011, the Rhino Rescue Project began a horn-trade control method consisting of infusing the horns of living rhinos with a mixture of a pink dye and an acaricide (to kill ticks) which is safe for rhinos but toxic to humans. The procedure also includes inserting three RFID identification chips and taking DNA samples. Because of the fibrous nature of rhino horn, the pressurized dye infuses the interior of the horn but does not color the surface or affect rhino behavior. Depending on the quantity of horn a person consumes, experts believe the acaricide would cause nausea, stomach-ache, and diarrhea, and possibly convulsions. It would not be fatal—the primary deterrent is the knowledge that the treatment has been applied, communicated by signs posted at the refuges. The original idea grew out of research into the horn as a reservoir for one-time tick treatments, and experts selected an acaricide they think is safe for the rhino, oxpeckers, vultures, and other animals in the preserve's ecosystem. Proponents claim that the dye cannot be removed from the horns, and remains visible on x-ray scanners even when the horn is ground to a fine powder.

The UK charity organization Save the Rhino has criticized horn poisoning on moral and practical grounds. The organization questions the assumptions that the infusion technique works as intended, and that even if the poison were effective, whether middlemen in a lucrative, illegal trade would care much about the effect it would have on buyers. Additionally, rhino horn is increasingly purchased for decorative use, rather than for use in traditional medicine. Save the Rhino questions the feasibility of applying the technique to all African rhinos, since workers would have to reapply the acaricide every 4 years. It was also reported that one out of 150 rhinos treated did not survive the anesthesia.

Artificial substitute for rhinoceros horn 
Another way to undercut the rhinoceros horn market has been suggested by Matthew Markus of Pembient, a biotechnology firm. He proposes the synthesis of an artificial substitute for rhinoceros horn. To enable authorities to distinguish the bioengineered horn from real rhinoceros horn, the genetic code of the bioengineered horn could be registered, similar to the DNA of living rhinoceros in the RhODIS (Rhino DNA Index System). Initial responses from many conservationists were negative, but a 2016 report from TRAFFIC—which monitors trade in wildlife and animal parts—conceded that it "...would be rash to rule out the possibility that trade in synthetic rhinoceros horn could play a role in future conservation strategies".

Historical representations 

Greek historian and geographer Agatharchides (2nd century BC) mentions the rhinoceros in his book On the Erythraean Sea.

In Khmer art, the  Hindu god Agni is depicted with a rhinoceros as his vahana. Similarly in medieval era Thai literature, Agni also called Phra Phloeng is sometimes described as riding a rhinoceros. 

Albrecht Dürer created a famous woodcut of a rhinoceros in 1515, based on a written description and brief sketch by an unknown artist of an Indian rhinoceros that had arrived in Lisbon earlier that year. He never saw the animal itself, so Dürer's Rhinoceros is a somewhat inaccurate depiction. Rhinoceros are depicted in the Chauvet Cave in France, pictures dated to 10,000–30,000 years ago.

There are legends about rhinoceroses stamping out fire in Burma, India, and Malaysia. The mythical rhinoceros has a special name in Malay, badak api, wherein badak means rhinoceros, and api means fire. The animal would come when a fire was lit in the forest and stamp it out. There are no recent confirmations of this phenomenon. This legend was depicted in the film The Gods Must Be Crazy (1980), which shows an African rhinoceros putting out two campfires.

In 1974 a lavender rhinoceros symbol began to be used as a symbol of the gay community in Boston.

See also

Conservation 

 Bardiya National Park
 Chitwan National Park
 International Rhino Foundation
 Kaziranga National Park
 List of odd-toed ungulates by population
 Nicolaas Jan van Strien
 Save the Rhino
 TRAFFIC

Individual rhinoceroses 

 Abada
 Clara
 List of fictional pachyderms
 Rhinoceros of Versailles

Literature 
 Rhinoceros, 1959 play

Other 
 Rhinoceroses in ancient China

References

Further reading 
 White Rhinoceros, White Rhinoceros Profile, Facts, Information, Photos, Pictures, Sounds, Habitats, Reports, News – National Geographic
 Laufer, Berthold. 1914. "History of the Rhinoceros". In: Chinese Clay Figures, Part I: Prolegomena on the History of Defence Armour. Field Museum of Natural History, Chicago, pp. 73–173.
 
 
 Chapman, January (1999). The Art of Rhinoceros Horn Carving in China. Christies Books, London. .

External links 
 

 Rhino Species & Rhino Images page on the Rhino Resource Center
 Rhinoceros entry on World Wide Fund for Nature website.
 International Anti Poaching Foundation
 Free To Use Rhino Images
 Rhinoceros Resources & Photos on African Wildlife Foundation website
 UK Times article: "South African spy chief linked to rhino horn trade" South African spy chief linked to rhino horn trade
 Video on South African government minister's alleged involvement in illegal rhino horn trade. VIDEO: Rhino poacher says Mahlobo is his 'mate'
 People Not Poaching: The Communities and IWT Learning Platform

 
Extant Eocene first appearances
Herbivorous mammals
Taxa named by John Edward Gray
Unicorns